Walter Althammer (born 12 March 1928 in Augsburg, Bavarian Swabia) is a German politician, representative of the Christian Social Union of Bavaria.

Together with Hans-Jürgen Pohlenz (SPD), they are the last surviving members of the 4th Bundestag, and following the death of Elfriede Klemmert of the 3rd Bundestag on 13 April 2022, the earliest-serving living former members of the Bundestag.

See also
List of Bavarian Christian Social Union politicians

References

1928 births
Living people
Politicians from Augsburg
Members of the Bundestag for Bavaria
Ludwig Maximilian University of Munich alumni
Knights Commander of the Order of Merit of the Federal Republic of Germany
Members of the Bundestag for the Christian Social Union in Bavaria